Changcheng 274 is a Type 6633 submarine of the People's Liberation Army Navy.

Development and design 

Original Chinese built Romeo, China was to have assembled these Romeos from knock-down kits provided by the Soviet Union, 6 were planned, but only 2 were completed. The construction program came to a complete stop when the USSR stopped delivery of parts following the Sino-Soviet split. Construction of the 3rd unit at Wuhan was stopped, and available parts were diverted to complete the first pair, but many parts had to be developed indigenously. The primary improvement of Type 6633 over the original Soviet boats is the use of domestic Chinese batteries, which had slightly superior performance to that of the original Soviet batteries.

Construction and career 

Changzheng 274 was decommissioned and serve as a museum ship in Taizhou Naval Museum, Qingdao.

References

Ships built in China
Romeo-class submarines
Museum ships in China